Acantharia is a genus of fungi.

Acantharia may also refer to:

 Acantharia Rojas 1897, a genus name in the Faboideae that is a nomen dubium
 Acantharia, an alternative spelling of Acantharea, a class of protozoa